Molly Evan Price is an American actress. She is best known for her role as Faith Yokas in the NBC drama series Third Watch (1999–2005). Price has also appeared in recurring and guest-starring roles in many other television dramas and co-starred in a number of films, including Sweet and Lowdown (1999), Chasing Sleep (2000), and Not Fade Away (2012).

Early life and education
Price was born in North Plainfield, New Jersey and graduated from North Plainfield High School in 1984. She is a graduate of Rutgers University.

Personal life
Price is married to New York City Fire Department firefighter Derek Kelly.

Career
Price made her television debut appearing in a 1991 episode of the NBC drama Law & Order. She later had three more guest roles in Law & Order, playing different characters. 

From 1995 to 1996, she was a regular cast member in the short-lived CBS sitcom Bless This House, starring Andrew Dice Clay and Cathy Moriarty. In film, she had supporting roles in Jersey Girl (1992) starring Jami Gertz and Dylan McDermott , Kiss Me, Guido (1997), Pushing Tin (1999), Woody Allen"s  Sweet and Lowdown (1999), Random Hearts (1999), and Chasing Sleep (2000) opposite Jeff Daniels.

In 1999, Price was cast as Police Officer (and later, Detective) Faith Yokas in the NBC crime drama series Third Watch, which she starred in from 1999 to 2005. Her husband was a recurring guest star on Third Watch as an FDNY firefighter, and she described her experiences as a firefighter's wife during the show's special 9/11 episode, entitled "In Their Own Words." She also appeared in two episodes of Sex and the City as Carrie Bradshaw's friend Susan Sharon, in 1999 and 2002, and reprised the role in an episode of the reboot And Just Like That..., in 2021. After Third Watch, Price starred in NBC's short-lived 2007 reboot of the 1970s series Bionic Woman, playing Ruth Treadwell.

Price has appeared in a number of television dramas playing guest starring roles, including Studio 60 on the Sunset Strip, Without a Trace as agent Samantha Spade's sister, ER, The Mentalist, Private Practice, Nip/Tuck, Body of Proof, Person of Interest, Shameless, Elementary, The Good Wife, and Law & Order: Special Victims Unit. From 2014 to 2015, Price had a recurring role in the Cinemax drama series The Knick, as Effie Barrow. In 2015, she co-starred in the short-lived Showtime comedy-drama Happyish. In film, Price played Uma Thurman's mother in The Life Before Her Eyes (2007) as well as co-starred in What Goes Up (2009), How Do You Know (2010), The Good Doctor (2011), and Not Fade Away (2012). In 2017, she appeared in the FX drama Feud as Robert Aldrich’s wife Harriet Foster. In 2017, she played the criminal defense attorney of Eric O'Bannon (Jamie McShane) in season 3 of the Netflix Original drama series, Bloodline.

References

External links
 
 Movie Tome list of her films

Actresses from New Jersey
American film actresses
American stage actresses
American television actresses
Living people
North Plainfield High School alumni
People from North Plainfield, New Jersey
Rutgers University alumni
20th-century American actresses
21st-century American actresses
Year of birth missing (living people)